The PFF Women's League (PFFWL) is the top-flight of women's association football in the Philippines.

History
To follow up with the PFF Women's Cup which was launched in 2014, the PFF Women's League was launched on November 5, 2016, by the Philippine Football Federation (PFF). The competition became the first to follow a league format following the folding of the Pinay Futbol League in 2013 and became the first women's domestic league in the country. The league sanctioned by PFF as an amateur league as part of FIFA's Women's Development Project for the Philippines. Prior to the league's establishment, the primary competition for women's football in the Philippines was the University Athletic Association of the Philippines (UAAP).

Most of the teams that are participating at the inaugural 2016–17 season were either from the UAAP or alumni teams. The PFF plans to hold a bigger amateur women's league to give more playing opportunities to collegiate players after they graduate from their respective universities and eventually professionalize the league so it can support itself. The league was launched to create a bigger pool for the Philippines women's national football team. De La Salle University were the champions of the inaugural season.

The PFF announced in July 2018 that a second season for the PFF Women's League will take place. The second season followed a single round robin format instead of multiple round robin format used for the inaugural season. This run was contested from August to November 2018. The league's players reportedly are compliant with the MyPFF online registration system of the Philippine Football Federation. De La Salle retained the league title.

The league has not been held since 2020 due to the COVID-19 pandemic.  A new season for the league wasplanned to be held from November to December 2022 with eight teams. The PFF later clarified that it would be holding the PFF Women's Cup.

There is also a plan to rebrand and reorganize the PFF Women's League to a commercial league after the 2023 FIFA Women's World Cup.

Teams
11 teams entered in the inaugural edition. Kaya withdrew mid-season. In the 2018 season, there were 10 teams with two being the new additional. The succeeding season retained a 10 team roster, with three teams from the previous season deciding not to enter.

Winners

Individual awards

Most Valuable Player

Best Goalkeeper

Best Defender

Best Midfielder

Golden Boot

See also
 AFC Women's Club Championship

References

External links

 
League
Philippines
Football competitions in the Philippines
Football leagues in the Philippines
2016 establishments in the Philippines
Sports leagues established in 2016